Nikolina is the given name of:
 Nikolina Angelkova (born 1979), Bulgarian politician
 Nikolina Božičević (born 1995), Croatian volleyball player
 Nikolina Brnjac (born 1978), Croatian politician
 Nikolina Grabovac (born 1968), Croatian basketball player
 Nikolina Ilijanić (born 1983), Croatian basketball player
 Nikolina Moldovan (born 1990), Serbian sprint canoer
 Nikolina Ristović (née Pišek; born 1973), Croatian TV presenter
 Nikolina Ruseva (born 1943), Bulgarian sprint canoer
 Nikolina Shtereva (born 1955), Bulgarian middle distance runner
 Nikolina Stepan (born 1988), Croatian long distance runner
 Nikolina Tankoucheva (born 1986), Bulgarian artistic gymnast
 Nikolina Vukčević (born 2000), Montenegrin handball player
 Nikolina Zadravec (born 1997), Croatian handball player
Nikolina may also refer to:

 "Nikolina", a 1917 song recorded by Hjalmar Peterson.

See also 
 

Russian feminine given names
Ukrainian feminine given names
Bulgarian feminine given names
Romanian feminine given names
Serbian feminine given names
Slovene feminine given names
Croatian feminine given names
Greek feminine given names
Polish feminine given names
Czech feminine given names
Slovak feminine given names